The Australian Basketball Association (ABA) was a semi-professional basketball entity based in Australia. The ABA was Australia's biggest basketball competition for many years. With over 120 teams participating across five leagues and six states, the ABA competition was the vital link between grass roots basketball in Australia and the elite NBL and WNBL leagues. The association provided a high standard of competition for local basketballers from across the country as well as an intense environment for professionals to use in their off seasons.

Between 1965 and 2008, the ABA played an integral part in the development of Australian basketball with hundreds of former and active NBL and WNBL players honing their skills against world-class opposition. Many NBL and WNBL clubs also benefited from their involvement in ABA competition, including the Melbourne Tigers who competed in the SEBL before joining the NBL.

In its heyday, the ABA incorporated five leagues – SEABL (south and east conferences), QABL (north conference), CABL (central conference), Big V (Victorian conference), and Waratah League (New South Wales conference). With the support of Basketball Australia, the competition consistently built upon the successful structure created by the well-respected Continental Basketball Association. The end result was a culmination of over 30 years of evolution, during which time the ABA had mushroomed from eight teams in the south-east of Australia to a competition that involved 135 men's and women's teams based in six states and territories. The ABA was representative of the huge number of junior-based associations across the country and was the endorsed national development league of the sport's peak body, Basketball Australia.

History
The Australian Basketball Association's (ABA) roots can be traced back as far as 1965, when just eight clubs competed in the South Eastern Conference (SEC). The SEC continued until 1971 when the Australian Club Championships gained pre-eminence.

In 1981, the SEC was reborn as the South Eastern Basketball League (SEBL) when the Australian Club Championships ceased to operate due to the rise of Australia's first truly national competition, the National Basketball League (NBL).

The SEBL was divided into a South and East Conference format in 1986; the same year Queensland's State Basketball League was founded. In 1994, the bodies merged to create the long-standing North, South and East Conference concept of the National Continental Basketball Association.

1998 saw further expansion with the inclusion of a Central Conference from South Australia. In that same year, the switch of NBL and WNBL seasons to Summer enabled the ABA to offer professional players a showcase for their skills during the Winter months.

Extensive discussions and numerous meetings regarding the establishment of an Australian-wide association based basketball championship consumed considerable energy and time throughout 1998. This activity culminated in December 1998 with the Basketball Australia Council formalising the ownership and the national structure of an association based national competition. This competition was set to consist of representation from Basketball Australia's Constituent Associations in a series of regional geographic competitions and incorporating the existing CBA competition structure. The management of this competition was offered to the CBA. To accommodate this decision, it was agreed that a new company, CBA (National) Ltd, would amend its Memorandum & Articles and change its name to Australian Basketball Association Ltd. Basketball Australia and all participating conferences were equal shareholders in this management company. The competition was thus promoted under the Australian Basketball Association banner from 1999 with further enhancements to be applied the following year as envisaged in the approved guidelines for the establishment and conduct of the new competition.
 
2000 saw the addition of Big V from Victoria and in 2001 the Waratah Conference from New South Wales was included for the first time.

Starting in 2002, the champions of each of the six conferences and a number of wildcard entries competed at the annual ABA National Finals. This addition of a truly national ABA finals series marked the dawn of a new era of national basketball competition in Australia. The ABA National Finals became known as the Australian Club Championships (ACC) in 2007 and continued on as such in 2008.

The ABA was abandoned following the 2008 season, resulting in the Big V, Central ABL, QBL, SEABL and Waratah League continuing on as independent leagues.

ABA National Champions

Men

Women

See also

 Basketball Australia
 Big V
 Central ABL
 List of developmental and minor sports leagues
 National Basketball League
 Queensland Basketball League
 South East Australian Basketball League
 State Basketball League
 Waratah League

References

External links 
 1998 CBA teams
 1981 to 1999 champions
 2002 to 2006 champions

 
Basketball leagues in Australia
Sports leagues established in 1965
1965 establishments in Australia
2008 disestablishments in Australia
Sports leagues disestablished in 2008